The Incredible Shrinking Dickies is the debut studio album by the California punk band The Dickies. It peaked at #18 on the UK album charts. The album includes the group's cover of Black Sabbath's "Paranoid," which reached No. 45 in the UK charts in July 1979. It was pressed on four different colors of vinyl (blue, yellow, orange, black).

The album was produced by John Hewlett, who in the late 1960s was a member of the UK garagepunk quartet John's Children.

Track listing

Personnel 

 Leonard Graves Phillips – Lead Vocals, Piano, Synthesizer, Organ
 Stan Lee – Guitars, Vocals
 Chuck Wagon – Keyboards, Guitar, Saxophone, Vocals
 Billy Club – Bass, Vocals
 Karlos Kaballero – Drums, No Vocals

Production:
 Produced by John Hewlett
 Engineered by Cisco de Luna, Earle Mankey & Gerry Kitchenham
 Mastered by Frank de Luna

References 

1979 debut albums
The Dickies albums
A&M Records albums